The Taichung LNG Terminal is a liquefied natural gas (LNG) terminal at Port of Taichung, Wuqi District, Taichung, Taiwan.

History
The terminal was inaugurated on 16 July 2009 by CPC Corporation as the second LNG terminal in Taiwan. On 24 August 2020, Port of Taichung operator Taiwan International Ports Corporation signed an agreement with CPC Corporation to lease the area next to west wharf number 11 and 12 of the port for the expansion of Taichung LNG Terminal.

Technical specifications
The terminal supplies vaporized LNG to Tatan Power Plant in Guanyin District, Taoyuan City via subsea gas pipeline.

See also
 List of LNG terminals

References

2009 establishments in Taiwan
Buildings and structures in Taichung
Energy infrastructure completed in 2009
Liquefied natural gas terminals in Taiwan